In human anatomy, Prussak's space is the small middle ear recess, bordered laterally by the flaccid part of Shrapnell's membrane, superiorly by the scutum (a sharp bony spur that is formed by the superior wall of the external auditory canal) and lateral malleal ligament, inferiorly by the lateral process of the malleus, and medially by the neck of the malleus. From the neck of the malleus, the anterior malleolar fold and the anterior ligament arise, demarcating Prussak's space anteriorly.  Ventilation of Prussak's space is only possible posteriorly above the posterior malleus fold.

It communicates with the posterior pouch of von Troltsch.

It is named after the Russian otologist Alexander Prussak (1839-1897).

Boundaries
 Medially: neck of malleus and lateral malleolar ligament
 Laterally: pars flaccida
 Inferiorly: lateral process of malleus
 Superiorly: lateral malleolar fold and scutum
 "Anteriorly:" anterior malleolar ligament

Clinical significance
Prussak's space is important because it is a site for pars flaccida acquired cholesteatoma formation.  A cholesteatoma forms when there is a deep retraction pocket in the tympanic membrane. The lining of the tympanic membrane, which is skin, is shed, but if the membrane is retracted it gets trapped. The debris collects and enlarges and ultimately forms a cholesteatoma.  This cholesteatoma, in turn, can  erode the middle ear ossicles, facial nerve, inner ear and even involve the brain.

From Prussak's space, located in the epitympanum, cholesteatoma patterns of spread are:
 Posterior epitympanum - through superior incudal space to mastoid antrum,
 Posterior mesotympanum - inferiorly through the posterior pouch of von Troeltsch to the stapes, round window, sinus tympani and facial recess.
 Anterior epitympanum - anterior to head of malleus, may gain access to supratubal recess via anterior pouch of von Troeltsch.

References

Human head and neck